Mrakovo may refer to:

Mrakovo (Ilijaš) a settlement in Ilijaš municipality of Bosnia and Herzegovina
Mrakovo, Jablanica, a settlement in Jablanica municipality of Bosnia and Herzegovina
Mrakovo, Russia (disambiguation), the name of several rural localities in Russia